This is list of Alpine lakes in India.

Arunachal Pradesh

 Sela Lake
 Sungester Lake
 Mehao Lake
 Pangateng Tso
 Nagula Lake

Himachal Pradesh

 Dashaur Lake
 Bhrigu Lake
 NeelKanth Mahadev Lake
 Ghepan Ghat
 Dyna Sar
 Manimahesh Lake
 Seruvalsar and Manimahesh Lake
 Chakund lake
 Kamrunag Lake
Dhankar Lake

Jammu and Kashmir

 Gadsar Lake
 Gangabal
 Tarsar Lake
 Tulian lake
 Vishansar Lake
 Satsar Lake
 Marsar Lake
 Krishansar Lake
 Nundkol Lake
 Sheshnag
 Shilsar lake
 Bilsar lake
 Choharnag lake
 Kounsarnag lake
 Katarnag lake
 Sonsar lake
 Damamsar lake
 Nehnaag lake
 Khilanag lake
 Nandansar lake
 Yamsar lake
 Khamsar lake
 Trusar lake
 Salnaisar lake
 Boadsar lake
 Koulsar lake
 Anderisar lake
 Chunsar lake
 Durinar Lake
 Sorus lake
 Salnai Lake
 Royalsar Lake
 Harbagwan Lake
 Dodsar lake

Ladakh

 Tso Moriri
 Pangong Tso
 Tso Kar
 Kyagar Tso
 Ryul Tso
 Chagar Tso
 Mirpal Tso
 Bangong Co
 Yaye Tso

Sikkim

 Tsomgo Lake
 Menmecho Lake
 Gurudongmar Lake
 Tso Lhamo Lake
Lampokhri
Sikkim jumley pokhri
Lakshmi pokhri

Uttarakhand

 Roopkund
 Kedartal
 Hemkund Lake
 Satopanth Tal
 Dodital
 Dodital
 Bedini Bugyal
Bisurital
Brahmatal
Deo Taal
Chorabari Lake
Kagbhusandi Tal
Kedartal

See also
 Alpine lake
 Himalayas

References

Glacial lakes of India
Lists of lakes of India
Lists of landforms of India